

Places

Laneuville may refer to the following places in France:

Laneuville-au-Pont, in the Haute-Marne département
Laneuville-au-Rupt, in the Meuse département 
Laneuville-sur-Meuse, in the Meuse département

People

Laneuville may refer to the following person:

Eric Laneuville (1952-), an American television director, producer and actor
Jean-Louis Laneuville (1748–1826), a French portrait painter

See also
Neuville (disambiguation)
La Neuville (disambiguation)